Jyoti Prakash Dutta may refer to:

 J. P. Dutta (born 1949), Indian film producer, writer and director
 Jyoti Prakash Dutta (writer), Bangladeshi short-story writer